Liberty Hill is an unincorporated community in Etowah County, Alabama, United States, located  east of Sardis City.

References

Unincorporated communities in Etowah County, Alabama
Unincorporated communities in Alabama